An isonym, in botanical taxonomy, is a name of a taxon that is identical to another designation, and based on the same type, but published at a different time by different authors.  Citation from that source follows: 

That is, the later isonyms are to be discarded (they are not botanical names), and only the first one is to be used (though it is not necessarily the accepted name for a taxon).

An exception is made for family names that have been conserved; the place of publication listed for those names is considered to be correct and the name valid (and legitimate), even if an earlier publication of the same name is discovered.

See also
 Basionym
 homonym (biology), identical names based on different types
 cf. isotype (biology), a duplicate of the holotype (not the type of an isonym)

Notes

References

Botanical nomenclature
Taxonomy (biology)